Made in N.Y.C. is the first live album released by the punk rock band The Casualties on SideOneDummy Records. The double disc album featured a "Welcome Home" show concluding the 'Punx for Life' tour, as well as a look at the history of the band and a tour of locations in New York City that played a part in the band's history. The show, in which admission was $5, was advertised on the Casualties' website, thecasualties.net (now defunct), in the news section. The supporting bands were Rabia and The Ghouls. Guitarist Jake Kolatis and Bassist Rick can be seen passing out flyers for the show the night before on the DVD.

Track listing
 "Casualties Army"
 "On The Front Line"
 "Under Attack"
 "Riot"
 "Fight For Your Life" 
 "V.I.P."
 "Ugly Bastard"
 "Criminal Class"
 "Punk Rock Love"
 "In It For Life"
 "Social Outcast"
 "Made in N.Y.C"
 "Blitzkrieg Bop"
 "On City Streets"
 "Get Off My Back"
 "System Failed Us...Again"
 "For The Punx"
 "Tomorrow Belongs To Us"
 "Unknown Soldier"
 "Down and Out"
 "Punx Unite"
 "40 Oz. Casualty"

2007 live albums
The Casualties albums
SideOneDummy Records live albums